Keep Believin' was a single released in 2005 by The Answer. Although it did not feature on their 2006 debut album, Rise, it was featured on the bonus disc of the special edition version of the same album, released in 2007.

Track listing

CD

 Keep Believin'
 So Cold
 No Questions Asked
 Be What You Want
 Keep Believin' (club mix)

Vinyl

 Keep Believin'
 New Day Rising

Personnel

Cormac Neeson - Lead vocals
Paul Mahon - Guitar
Micky Waters - Bass
James Heatley - Drums

The Answer (band) songs
2005 songs
Albert Productions singles